In linear algebra and operator theory, the resolvent set of a linear operator is a set of complex numbers for which the operator is in some sense "well-behaved".  The resolvent set plays an important role in the resolvent formalism.

Definitions

Let X be a Banach space and let  be a linear operator with domain .  Let id denote the identity operator on X.  For any , let

A complex number  is said to be a regular value if the following three statements are true:
  is a bounded linear operator;
  is defined on a dense subspace of X, that is,  has dense range.
The resolvent set of L is the set of all regular values of L:

The spectrum is the complement of the resolvent set:

The spectrum can be further decomposed into the point/discrete spectrum (where condition 1 fails), the continuous spectrum (where conditions 1 and 3 hold but condition 2 fails) and the residual/compression spectrum (where condition 1 holds but condition 3 fails).

If  is a closed operator, then so is each , and condition 3 may be replaced by requiring that  is surjective.

Properties

 The resolvent set  of a bounded linear operator L is an open set.
 More generally, the resolvent set of a densely defined closed unbounded operator is an open set.

References

   (See section 8.3)

External links

See also
Resolvent formalism
Spectrum (functional analysis)
Decomposition of spectrum (functional analysis)

Linear algebra
Operator theory